Melville Beach is a resort village in the Canadian province of Saskatchewan within Census Division No. 5. It is on the shores of Crooked Lake in the Rural Municipality of Grayson No. 184.

History 
Melville Beach incorporated as a resort village on July 1, 1983.

Demographics 

Government 
The Resort Village of Melville Beach is governed by an elected municipal council and an appointed administrator. The mayor is Ken Gerhardt and its administrator is Kayla Hauser.

See also 
List of communities in Saskatchewan
List of municipalities in Saskatchewan
List of resort villages in Saskatchewan
List of villages in Saskatchewan
List of summer villages in Alberta

References

External links 

Resort villages in Saskatchewan
Grayson No. 184, Saskatchewan
Division No. 5, Saskatchewan